The Architectural and Building Journal of Queensland was a monthly trade magazine about architecture and construction published in Brisbane, Queensland, Australia.

History
The journal was established in July 1922 and published monthly. In February 1944 it changed its name to Architectural & Building Journal until April 1945, after which it became Architecture, Building, Engineering until June 1954. It then changed its name to Architecture, Building, Structural Engineering until March 1971, when it returned to Architecture, Building, Engineering until its final issue in December 1973.

References

Architecture magazines
Business magazines published in Australia
Defunct magazines published in Australia
English-language magazines
Magazines established in 1922
Magazines disestablished in 1973
Mass media in Brisbane
Monthly magazines published in Australia